Peter Lee Shih Shiong (born 24 July 1966) is a Singaporean musician, composer, and record producer. In 2001, Lee won a Golden Melody Award for Best Composition for his work, "Cloudy Day", performed by his apprentice Stefanie Sun.

Musical career 
In 2006, Lee, with his brother, opened the Lee Wei Song Music School in Shanghai. They opened another branch in Beijing in 2010.

Personal life 
Lee has a twin brother, Lee Wei Shiong.

Awards & Nominations

References

External links

1967 births
Living people
Hakka musicians
People from Dabu
Singaporean composers
20th-century Singaporean male singers
Singaporean Mandopop singers
Singaporean people of Hakka descent
Singaporean twins